Quentin Bell was an English art historian and author.

Quentin Bell may also refer to:

 Bubba Monroe (1960–2022), American professional wrestler and trainer
 Quentin Bell (activist) (born 1987/88), African-American transgender rights activist